Anna-Maria Fernandez and Julie Richardson were the defending champions but did not compete that year.

Natalia Bykova and Natalia Medvedeva won in the final 7–6, 6–3 against Leila Meskhi and Svetlana Parkhomenko.

Seeds
Champion seeds are indicated in bold text while text in italics indicates the round in which those seeds were eliminated. The top three seeded teams received a bye into the quarterfinals.

 Leila Meskhi /  Natalia Medvedeva (final)
 Larisa Savchenko /  Natasha Zvereva (quarterfinals)
 Jenny Byrne /  Michelle Jaggard (quarterfinals)
 Lea Antonoplis /  Barbara Gerken (first round)

Draw

References
 1988 Singapore Open Doubles Draw

Singapore doubles
WTA Singapore Open
1988 in Singaporean sport
Women's sports competitions in Singapore